Woolwich ferry wharf (also known as Valentia Street ferry wharf) is located on Sydney Harbour serving the Sydney suburb of Woolwich. The single wharf is served by First Fleet and Emerald class ferries.

Wharves & services

Connections
Busways operate two bus routes to and from Woolwich wharf:
505: to Town Hall (morning peak only)
538: to Gladesville

References

External links

 Woolwich Wharf at Transport for New South Wales (Archived 13 June 2019)
Woolwich Local Area Map Transport for NSW

Ferry wharves in Sydney
Woolwich, New South Wales